Oskino is a rural locality (a selo) and the administrative center of Oskinskoye Rural Settlement, Khokholsky District, Voronezh Oblast, Russia. The population was 709 as of 2010. There are 19 streets.

Geography 
Oskino is located 56 km southeast of Khokholsky (the district's administrative centre) by road. Rossoshki is the nearest rural locality.

References 

Rural localities in Khokholsky District